Luis Horna was the defending champion, but he chose to not start this year.
Stanislas Wawrinka won in the final 7–5, 6–3, against Potito Starace.

Seeds

Draw

Finals

Top half

Bottom half

References
 Main Draw
 Qualifying Draw

BSI Challenger Lugano - Singles
BSI Challenger Lugano